Douglas Scott Stewart (born January 16, 1969 in Vancouver, British Columbia) is a former Canadian national rugby player.

Career
His first international cap for Canada was on September 23, 1989, against United States in Toronto. He was also part of the 1991 Rugby World Cup Canada squad, playing all the matches against Fiji, Romania, France and New Zealand. He was also in the 1995 and in the 1999 World Cups, playing all the three pool stage matches in both tournaments. His last test was against England, on June 9, 2001, in Burnaby Lake. At club level, he played for the UBC, UBC Old Boys, Harlequins and Bedford Blues and Dax.

In 2018, Stewart was inducted into the British Columbia Rugby Hall of Fame. Since then he has been inducted to the British Columbia Sports Hall of Fame as a member of the 1991 Canadian World Cup Team and the Canadian Rugby Hall of Fame in 2019.

Notes

External links
Scott Stewart international statistics

1969 births
Living people
Canadian rugby union players
Bedford Blues players
Harlequin F.C. players
Sportspeople from Vancouver
Rugby union fullbacks
Canada international rugby union players
Canadian expatriate rugby union players
Expatriate rugby union players in England
Canadian expatriate sportspeople in England